Tlaxochimaco  is the name of the ninth  Month of the Aztec calendar. It is also a festival  in the Aztec religion, dedicated to the  Aztec God of War Huitzilopochtli. It is called the Bestowal or Birth of Flowers.

References

Aztec calendars
Aztec mythology and religion